This is a list of Old Newingtonians awarded Imperial and Australian honours. Imperial honours are the orders, decorations, and medals of the United Kingdom that were awarded to Australian citizens prior to the institution of the Australian honours system in 1975. Australian honours have been awarded to Australian citizens since 1975. The Centenary Medal was established in 2001 to commemorate the Centenary of Federation of Australia, and was awarded on one occasion, 1 January 2001.

Old Newingtonians are alumni of Newington College, an independent Uniting Church single-sex primary and secondary day and boarding school for boys, located in Sydney, New South Wales, Australia.

See also 

 Newington College
 List of Old Newingtonians
 List of Old Newingtonians with Australian Dictionary of Biography biographies

References

External links 
 Newington College website
 ONU website
 The Australian Government Honours and Awards website

Lists of people educated in New South Wales by school affiliation
 
Sydney-related lists
Lists of Australian men